Charles T. Holt House is a historic home located at Haw River, Alamance County, North Carolina. It was designed by architect George Franklin Barber and built in 1897.  The house is a -story, rectangular dwelling sheathed in wood, slate, brick and stone in the Queen Anne style.  It features peaks, turrets and decorative chimney stacks. Also on the property are the contributing carriage house, servant's quarters, gas house, corn crib, barn, and well house / flowerhouse. It was built  for textile businessman Charles T Holt, the son of Thomas Michael Holt, governor of North Carolina, and his wife Gena Jones Holt, the daughter of Thomas Goode Jones, governor of Alabama.

It was added to the National Register of Historic Places in 1982.

References

Houses on the National Register of Historic Places in North Carolina
Queen Anne architecture in North Carolina
Houses completed in 1897
Houses in Alamance County, North Carolina
National Register of Historic Places in Alamance County, North Carolina